The common garden skink (Lampropholis guichenoti) is a small species of lizard in the family Scincidae. The species is endemic to Australia. Additional common names for L. guichenoti include grass skink, Guichenot's grass skink, pale-flecked garden sunskink, and penny lizard.

Etymology
The specific name, guichenoti, is in honor of French zoologist Antoine Alphonse Guichenot.

Geographic range
In Australia, L. guichenoti is often seen in suburban gardens in Adelaide, Melbourne, Perth, Sydney, Canberra and Brisbane, but also is common across most of Southern Australia, Tasmania, and some of New South Wales.

Description
Lampropholis guichenoti can grow to a maximum of 14 cm, but the average is 8-10 centimetres. The average common garden skink lives for 2–3 years. The garden skink usually has a browny black colour and sometimes may appear a dark shade of red when bathing in the sun. The lighter their colour the more energetic they are. They have small sharp teeth which easily slice through smaller prey. Even wild individuals are very docile, and rarely bite humans when touched or picked up.

The female pale-flecked garden sunskink has a yellowish, almost orange tinge to her underside, however the males have a light grey tinge to their underside. Females are often bigger than the males in size.

Capable swimmers, Skinks have been known to dive under water to evade predators and remain submerged for several minutes until a threat has passed.

Diet
Garden skinks feed on larger invertebrates, including crickets, moths, slaters, earthworms, flies, grubs and caterpillars, grasshoppers, cockroaches, earwigs, slugs, dandelions, small spiders, ladybeetles and many other small insects, which makes them a very helpful animal around the garden. They can also feed on fruit and vegetables, but the vegetables have to be cooked for the skink to be able to eat it. Skinks especially love bananas and strawberries etc. (no citrus fruit). Garden skinks rely purely on the movement of their prey when hunting. When hunting, the skinks will either hide and wait for prey to come by or actively pursue it (this depends on how hungry they are). Once they have caught their prey, they shake it around vigorously to kill it before swallowing it whole. Once they have had one meal, they begin to actively pursue prey for a short while with their newfound energy. Garden skinks only need one prey item per 4 or 5 days, thus making it an ideal pet for small children. They can eat worms if you drain the soil out of them with salt water because worms are too high in soil for them.

Habitat
Skinks are often seen under leaves, in long grass and under rocks so that they can watch their prey, they often prefer hiding in logs where their larger predators cannot reach them. As with most reptiles, the Common garden skink is cold blooded, and may be seen on top of rocks or paths in the morning trying to warm their blood. Skinks enjoy large areas with a lot of leaves and soft soil. They are normally found around hot and dusty areas that have many trees and stumps.

Predators
The garden skink's predators are mainly birds and cats. Even tiny birds like robins are a threat to skinks. Larger lizards and snakes will sometimes try to eat them as well. Like many other skinks, its tail will drop if grasped roughly. The disconnected tail will twitch vigorously for a while, capturing the attention of the predator while the lizard makes its escape. This survival tactic may seem hard for the skink to tolerate, but it is quite the opposite. Although it may cost the skink some energy, the skink's tail will eventually grow back to normal.

Eggs
The common garden skink is oviparous and lays small white eggs between summer and mid autumn. The female usually lays about six eggs, often in communal clutches that may contain as many as 250 eggs altogether, usually under a cluster of rocks to keep them safe from predators. The eggs hatch in a matter of weeks after they are laid. Most eggs are around 10 mm.

References

Skinks of Australia
Endemic fauna of Australia
Lampropholis
Reptiles described in 1839
Taxa named by André Marie Constant Duméril
Taxa named by Gabriel Bibron